Hosszúpályi is a village in Hajdú-Bihar county, in the Northern Great Plain region of eastern Hungary.

Geography
Much of the population is Roma. There is an elementary school, a police station, surgery and a dentist's office here. In the past agriculture was the main sector but it has been decreasing.

References

External links

  in Hungarian

Populated places in Hajdú-Bihar County